Mosheva is a rural locality (a village) in Beloyevskoye Rural Settlement, Kudymkarsky District, Perm Krai, Russia. The population was 160 as of 2010. There are 6 streets.

Geography 
Mosheva is located 12 km northwest of Kudymkar (the district's administrative centre) by road. Yegichi is the nearest rural locality.

References 

Rural localities in Kudymkarsky District